Folketing elections were held in Denmark on 3 April 1901.

Campaign
Eight of the 114 seats were uncontested, of which six were won by the Venstre Reform Party and two by the Social Democratic Party.

Results

References

Elections in Denmark
Denmark
Folketing
Denmark